Faiza Gillani is a Pakistani television, theatre and film actress known for her character roles. Made her on-screen debut in 2010, and her notable supporting roles were in Ullu Baraye Farokht Nahi, Sannata, Deewangi and Prem Gali. She made her cinematic debut with 2019 crime thriller Laal Kabootar.

Career

Film

Television

Web series

References 

Pakistani film actresses
Living people
Pakistani stage actresses
21st-century Pakistani actresses
1980 births